Anhalamine is a naturally occurring alkaloid which can be isolated from Lophophora williamsii. It is structurally related to mescaline.

See also
 Anhalinine
 Anhalonidine
 Pellotine

References

Isoquinoline alkaloids
Norsalsolinol ethers